Comunardo Niccolai (born 15 December 1946) is an Italian former footballer, who played as a defender.

Club career
A tough, physically strong centre-back, Niccolai initially began his career with Torres in 1963, before joining Cagliari Calcio, where he played from 1964 to 1976, winning the only Serie A championship in the club's entire club history in 1970. He ended his career in 1977 with Perugia. Niccolai played 218 Serie A matches, and is still remembered today for his proneness to score own goals, including some very spectacular ones.

International career
Niccolai made three appearances for the Italy national football team in 1970, and represented the team at the 1970 FIFA World Cup, where he won a runners-up medal; he only appeared in Italy's opening group match, a 1–0 win against Sweden on 3 June, as he was replaced by Roberto Rosato in the 37th minute, after sustaining an injury which kept him out of the remainder of the tournament. This led his Cagliari coach Manlio Scopigno to declare: "I could expect everything from my life, but to see Niccolai in international telecast".

After retirement
He is currently working with the Italian Football Federation as national team scout. He also worked as a youth coach for the Cagliari under-18 side.

Honours

Club
Cagliari
Serie A: 1969–70

International
Italy
FIFA World Cup: 1970 (Runner-up)

References

External links
Communardo Niccolai profile @ gazzetta.it 
Communardo Niccolai profile @ archiviorossoblu.it 
Communardo Niccolai profile @ cagliaristory.it 

1946 births
Living people
Sportspeople from the Province of Pistoia
Italian footballers
Italy international footballers
Cagliari Calcio players
A.C. Perugia Calcio players
Serie A players
1970 FIFA World Cup players
Association football defenders
S.E.F. Torres 1903 players
A.C. Prato players
Italian football managers
Italy women's national football team managers
Footballers from Tuscany